Richard Godwyn (died 1601) of Wells, Somerset, was an English politician.

He was a Member (MP) of the Parliament of England for Wells in 1593.

References

16th-century births
1601 deaths
People from Wells, Somerset
English MPs 1593